Seafox is a shoot 'em up written by Ed Hobbs and published by Broderbund  in 1982 for the Apple II and as a cartridge for the Atari 8-bit family. A VIC-20 port, also on cartridge, was released in 1983.

Gameplay

Seafox is a game in which the player uses a submarine to destroy enemy ships. The submarine is fully maneuverable beneath the surface by joystick control. Torpedoes can be fired upward at ships on the surface, or at enemy submarines. Red Cross hospital ships must be avoided.

The player's submarine has a limited fuel and torpedoes supply, so both must be frequently replenished. This is achieved with the help of a supply sub and a friendly dolphin. The player must intercept the package before giant clams steal it or enemy submarines destroy it. If the player shoots the dolphin, an indestructible orange shark appears and destroys the player's sub. 

Only three submarines are allowed each game, with each one starting out with a full load of fuel and torpedoes.

Reception
In a review for Electronic Games, Steve Davidson ended with: "Sea Fox [sic] will never be confused with a realistic military simulation, but it offers oceans of fun for target game fans". Luther Shaw reviewed the game for Computer Gaming World writing that "the graphics are nice but there are better games in the Broderbund line".

A January 1983 Creative Computing review concluded:

References

External links
Review in Softline
1984 Software Encyclopedia from Electronic Games
Review in Softalk
Addison Wesley Book of Atari Software 1984
Review in Ahoy!
Review in Personal Computer World
Review in InCider
Review in Compute!'s Gazette

1982 video games
Apple II games
Atari 8-bit family games
Broderbund games
Commodore 64 games
Naval video games
Shoot 'em ups
Submarines in fiction
VIC-20 games
Video games developed in the United States
Video games with underwater settings